Sumoll Blanc is a white grape variety, native to Tarragona in Catalonia,  Spain. Although it shares its name with the red grape variety Sumoll, it is genetically unrelated.

Synonyms
Spanish synonyms include Sumoi Blanc and Sumoll Blanco.

Viticulture
It is an authorised grape variety in the Spanish Denominación de Origen Protegida (DOP) (Denominació d'Origen Protegida in Catalan) of Catalunya DOP, Conca de Barberà DOP, and Tarragona.

References

Spanish wine
Grape varieties of Spain
White wine grape varieties